The Isis River is a river in the Wide Bay–Burnett region of Queensland, Australia.

Not far from its junction with the Isis River, the Burrum and the Gregory River form a confluence and empty into the Coral Sea at Burrum Heads. The river descends  over its  course.

South of Childers, the river is crossed by the Bruce Highway via the Isis River Bridge.

The river was named by its European discoverers, two colonial surveyors who likened it to the River Isis in Oxfordshire, England. Other features such as the Isis Highway and the Isis Shire draw their name from the river.

See also

References

Rivers of Queensland
Wide Bay–Burnett